Marcel Schlechter (born 9 July 1928 in Luxembourg City) is a retired Luxembourgian politician and government minister who started his career as a bus driver.  A member of the Luxembourg Socialist Workers' Party, Schlechter served in the Santer-Poos Ministry I as Minister for Transport, Minister for Public Works, and Minister for Energy.  He was a Member of the European Parliament from 1989 until 1999.

References

|-

|-

Ministers for Energy of Luxembourg
Ministers for Public Works of Luxembourg
Ministers for Transport of Luxembourg
Members of the Chamber of Deputies (Luxembourg)
Councillors in Echternach
Luxembourg Socialist Workers' Party politicians
Luxembourgian trade unionists
1928 births
Living people
People from Luxembourg City
Luxembourg Socialist Workers' Party MEPs
MEPs for Luxembourg 1989–1994
MEPs for Luxembourg 1994–1999